Dixons may refer to:

Currys plc - the current parent company of numerous European retailers of electronic goods, formerly known as Dixons Carphone
Dixons Retail - former parent company, before its merger with Carphone Warehouse
Dixons (retailer), former British electronic goods retailer
Dixons Travel, a current spin-off of the former brand, exclusive to airports
Dixons (Netherlands), a Dutch electricals retailer, originally part of the British Dixons, now independent 
Dixon's factorization method, an application of the square factoring method
Dixons Lake, Nova Scotia, Canada
J F Dixons, former department store, Southend-on-Sea, England

See also
Dixon (disambiguation)
Dickson (disambiguation)